Endrendrum Kadhal is a 1999 Indian Tamil-language romantic drama film  written, directed and co-produced by Manoj Bhatnagar. The film stars Vijay and Rambha with Raghuvaran, Nizhalgal Ravi, Bhanupriya, Radha Ravi, Charle, and Dhamu in other pivotal roles. Veteran actor M. N. Nambiar also played a supporting role, while Manoj Bhatnagar also composed the film's music. The film open on 5 March 1999 to positive reviews but performed average at the box office. The film saw Vijay and Rambha sharing the screen for the 2nd time after the success of Ninaithen Vandhai (1998). The satellite rights were sold to Jaya TV for 3 crore above the film budget, marking the film's success.

Plot
Vijay is the managing director of a large shipping corporation. He lives in a joint family with his father Sethupathi, two brothers Krishna and Vasu, their wives and children, and a spinster sister Pooja. Vijay goes to Switzerland in Europe to stipulate a contract with Nagaraj and Shekar. There, he meets Meenakshi, Nagaraj's sister. The two of them fall in love. Nagaraj approves of Vijay, but when he expresses the condition that Vijay should stay with them after the marriage because India is not good, he refuses his offer and returns home. However, Shekar and Meenu later  travel to India to mend fences. Shekar learns that Pooja had been dumped by Nagaraj for a better life, and Vijay is just waiting for an opportunity to kill the man who destroyed his sister's life. He devises ways of preventing Nagaraj from attending the marriage, but he later tells Pooja the truth. Vijay overhears this and is angered, but Shekar solves all the problems by deciding to marry Pooja. Pooja agrees for this too, making everyone happy. Finally, Vijay, seeing his sister happy leaves Nagaraj alone. Eventually, Meenu and Vijay get married.

Cast

Production
The film marked a comeback for actress Bhanupriya, who was signed on for the film in November 1998, after she had relocated base to the USA. Meena was initially approached for the film, but had to turn the offer down due to her busy schedule and Rambha was selected as heroine.

Soundtrack
The music was composed by Manoj Bhatnagar and released by Pyramid.

Release
This low-budget production opened to positive reviews, with a critic from Indolink.com claiming "even though the film has absolutely nothing new to offer, it doesn’t test your patience." The Deccan Herald labelled that "all in all it is a pleasant film"  and that "Vijay’s a little glib, Rambha’s weight loss makes her look haggard and Raghuvaran as not a villain is nice", claiming it was "worth a look". A review from Tamil Movie Cafe noted "an ordinary love story has been made fairly entertaining". Ananda Vikatan rated the film 34 out of 100.

References

External links
 

1999 films
1990s Tamil-language films
Indian romantic drama films
1999 romantic drama films
Films with screenplays by Crazy Mohan